Sashtiabdhapoorthi is a Sanskrit name for a special ceremony on a person's sixtieth birthday. It has a special place in the Hindu tradition since the Hindu calendar follows a 60-year cycle. On this day, all the celestial bodies are said to align in exactly the same way they were during the birth of the individual concerned. The entire family gathers to give and seek blessings to and from the subject for continued good health and prosperity. The subject and their spouse reaffirm their wedding vows and there is a re-enactment of their wedding ceremony.

References

External links
A man's page on his Sashtiabdhapoorthi

Hindu calendar